Charles Teetai Ane Jr. (January 25, 1931 – May 9, 2007) was an American football offensive lineman who played in the National Football League (NFL) for the Detroit Lions. He played college football at the University of Southern California.

Early years
Ane excelled in baseball, basketball and track as well as football at the Punahou School in Honolulu, Hawaii. He was a key two-way lineman on the powerful Buffanblu teams of the late 1940s.

He was inducted into the Hawaii Sports Hall of Fame. In 2015, he was inducted into the Polynesian Football Hall of Fame.

College career
Ane attended Compton Community College, before transferring to the University of Southern California. He was a two-way tackle and quarterback in the single wing offense. He also played baseball before leaving a year early for the NFL. He was an All-Coast selection in the early 1950s.

In 2007, he was inducted into the USC Athletic Hall Of Fame.

Professional career
Ane was selected by the Detroit Lions in the fourth round (49th overall) of the 1953 NFL Draft. As a rookie, he was a backup for center Vince Banonis. The next year was named the starter at right tackle. After his third year. he was rotated between the center and the right tackle positions throughout his career.

He was elected to the Pro Bowl in 1956 and 1958. He helped the Lions to three division titles, two NFL championships and was voted team captain from 1958 to 1959. He only missed one game during his seven-year career.

Ane was selected by the Dallas Cowboys in the 1960 NFL Expansion Draft, but he opted to retire instead of reporting to the team.

Coaching career
Ane served as head football coach at Damien Memorial School on Oahu and St. Anthony High School on Maui and was an assistant coach at Punahou, Radford High School and Kaimuki High School. Ane was later an assistant coach under his son at Punahou for four seasons from 1999 to 2003.

Personal life
His son, Charles "Kale" Teetai Ane III played at Michigan State and for seven seasons in the NFL before becoming head football coach at Punahou School.

Ane died on May 9, 2007 in Honolulu. He was 76 years old and died after prolonged health issues.

References

External links
Hawaii Sports Hall of Fame Profile

1931 births
2007 deaths
American football centers
American football offensive guards
Detroit Lions players
USC Trojans football players
Western Conference Pro Bowl players
Punahou School alumni
Players of American football from Honolulu
American sportspeople of Samoan descent